Deh-e Miran or Deh Miran may refer to:
 Deh-e Miran, Khuzestan
 Deh-e Miran, Sistan and Baluchestan